The FIBT World Championships 2000 took place in Altenberg, Germany (men's bobsleigh), Winterberg, Germany (women's bobsleigh), and Igls, Austria (men's and women's skeleton). Altenberg hosted the championship event for the fourth time, doing so previously in 1991 (bobsleigh), 1994 (skeleton), and 1999 (skeleton). Winterberg hosted the championship event for the second time, doing so previously in 1995 (bobsleigh). Igls hosted the championship for the fifth time, doing do previously in 1935 (two-man) and 1963, 1991 (skeleton), and 1993 (bobsleigh). Two-woman bobsleigh and women's skeleton debuted at these championships.

Bobsleigh

Two man

Four man

Two woman

Kohlisch competed for the Germans in luge, winning ten World Championship and three European championship medals between 1987 and 1997.

Skeleton

Men

Women

Medal table

References
2-Man bobsleigh World Champions
2-Woman bobsleigh World Champions
4-Man bobsleigh World Champions
Men's skeleton World Champions
Women's skeleton World Champions

IBSF World Championships
2000 in bobsleigh
FIBT World Championships
FIBT World Championships
2000 in skeleton
Sport in Altenberg, Saxony
Bobsleigh in Germany
Bobsleigh in Austria
International sports competitions hosted by Germany
International sports competitions hosted by Austria
Skeleton in Austria
2000s in Saxony